The men's 400 metres event at the 1997 European Athletics U23 Championships was held in Turku, Finland, on 10, 11 and 12 July 1997.

Medalists

Results

Final
12 July

Semifinals
11 July
Qualified: first 4 in each to the Final

Semifinal 1

Semifinal 2

Heats
10 July
Qualified: first 4 in each heat and 4 best to the Semifinal

Heat 1

Heat 2

Heat 3

Participation
According to an unofficial count, 20 athletes from 15 countries participated in the event.

 (1)
 (1)
 (1)
 (1)
 (1)
 (2)
 (1)
 (1)
 (2)
 (1)
 (2)
 (1)
 (1)
 (2)
 (2)

References

400 metres
400 metres at the European Athletics U23 Championships